The House of Ganesha was the second royal house of the late medieval Sultanate of Bengal. It is named after its founder Raja Ganesha, a wealthy Hindu nobleman, who succeeded the former Ilyas Shahi dynasty. His son embraced Islam and ruled as Jalaluddin Muhammad Shah, and was succeeded by his son Shamsuddin Ahmad Shah.

History
The Ganesha dynasty began with Raja Ganesha in 1414, from the Bengal region of the Indian subcontinent. After Raja Ganesha seized control over Bengal, he faced an imminent threat of invasion. Ganesha appealed to a powerful Muslim holy man named Qutb al Alam to stop the threat. The saint agreed on the condition that Raja Ganesha's son, Jadu, would convert to Islam and rule in his place. Raja Ganesha agreed and Jadu started ruling Bengal as Jalaluddin Muhammad Shah in 1415.

Qutb al Alam died in 1416 and Raja Ganesha was emboldened to depose his son and return to the throne as Danujamarddana Deva. Jalaluddin was reconverted to Hinduism by the Golden Cow ritual. After the death of his father, Jalaluddin once again converted to Islam and started ruling again. Jalaluddin's son, Shamsuddin Ahmad Shah ruled for only 3 years due to chaos and anarchy. The dynasty is known for its liberal policies as well as its focus on justice and charity.

List of rulers

References

Medieval Bengal
Sultans of Bengal
15th-century Indian monarchs